Foni Bondali is one of the nine districts of the Gambia's Western Division, which is located to the south of the Gambia River in the southwest of the country. Foni Bondali is in the southeast of the division, between Foni Kansala and Foni Jarrol.

References 

West Coast Division (The Gambia)
Districts of the Gambia